Kerekais a village in Dryanovo Municipality, in Gabrovo Province, in northern central Bulgaria.

Kereka Island is named after Kereka.

References

Villages in Gabrovo Province